The 1975 Swedish speedway season was the 1975 season of motorcycle speedway in Sweden.

Individual

Individual Championship
The 1975 Swedish Individual Speedway Championship final was held on 26 September in Gothenburg. Anders Michanek won the Swedish Championship for the second time.

Junior Championship
 
Winner - Bo Jansson

Team

Team Championship
Bysarna won division 1 and were declared the winners of the Swedish Speedway Team Championship for the third time. The team included Christer Sjösten, Sören Sjösten and Christer Löfqvist.

Njudungarna won the second division, while Gamarna and Piraterna won the third division north and south respectively.

See also 
 Speedway in Sweden

References

Speedway leagues
Professional sports leagues in Sweden
Swedish
Seasons in Swedish speedway